The pale-striped ground gecko (Lucasium immaculatum) is a gecko endemic to Australia.

References

Lucasium
Reptiles described in 1988
Taxa named by Glen Milton Storr
Geckos of Australia